Cyberspace service regulation system act  طرح نظام تنظیم مقررات خدمات فضای مجازی or just  طرح صیانت از فضای مجازی Cyberspace protection bill lit. security plan is a cyberlaw put in place in 2022 in Islamic Republic of Iran. Between Iranians the act has become infamous and notorious. It puts the responsibility of controlling internet exchange points on Iranian Armed Forces.

Bill

Data 
Corporations are required by law to safeguard Iranian users' private data; though it also requires  National Information Network's "sanitation",  prevention, countering and detection of cyber crime and obeying courts and Iranian judicial system orders'.

Effect of the bill 
Radio Farda reported that Instagram (at the time unblocked in Iran) may be affected by the act.

References

Censorship in Iran
Internet censorship in Iran
Internet in Iran
All articles with unsourced statements
Law of Iran